Germán Sánchez Flor (born 4 July 1989 in Alicante) is a Spanish racing driver.

Career

Formula Three
Sánchez made his car racing debut aged just sixteen, when he took part in the 2006 Spanish Formula Three Championship. Driving a Dallara F300 for Escuela Profiltek, Sánchez was also eligible for the secondary Copa de España as he was driving an older car than most other competitors. Sánchez won the Copa de España, winning seven of the fifteen races, with three other podium finishes. He also amassed seventeen points towards the main championship, and finished 13th overall. For the 2007 season, he moved to Campos Racing and the main championship. Sánchez finished fourth in the championship, scoring two wins at Albacete and Jerez, and scored two third-place finishes at Jerez and Barcelona.

Sánchez continued with Campos into the 2008 season. He won again at Albacete, and also won one of the first races to be held at the Valencia Street Circuit, in order for the circuit to acquire the licence that was required to host the European Grand Prix a month later. Further wins at Magny-Cours and the Circuit de Valencia helped him to edge out Nelson Panciatici for the title, despite a non-scoring finale in Barcelona.

Formula Two
2009 saw Sánchez move up to the FIA Formula Two Championship, driving car number 27. Despite missing the races in Barcelona, he finished 24th in the championship, with a pair of eighths at Imola.

Racing record

Career summary

Complete FIA Formula Two Championship results
(key) (Races in bold indicate pole position) (Races in italics indicate fastest lap)

References

External links
 Official website
 Career statistics from Driver Database

1989 births
Living people
Spanish racing drivers
FIA Formula Two Championship drivers
Euroformula Open Championship drivers
Campos Racing drivers